The Shire of Atherton was a local government area of Queensland. It was located on the Atherton Tableland, a plateau forming part of the Great Dividing Range west of the city of Cairns.

History

The Tinaroo Division was created on 3 September 1881 under the Divisional Boards Act 1879 out of parts of the Cairns, Hinchinbrook and Woothakata Divisions, and was responsible for a large area which took in Herberton and Lake Eacham.

On 20 December 1890, part of the Tinaroo Division was excised to create the new Barron Division.

In 1894, Tinaroo Division's headquarters transferred from Tinaroo to Atherton. On 11 May 1895 it decreased somewhat in size as it lost some areas in the south and southwest which incorporated separately as the Herberton Division.

With the passage of the Local Authorities Act 1902, Tinaroo Division became Shire of Tinaroo on 31 March 1903. On 18 November 1910 it lost the area around Lake Eacham to the new Shire of Eacham, and in 1935, the Shire of Tinaroo was renamed Shire of Atherton.

On 15 March 2008, under the Local Government (Reform Implementation) Act 2007 passed by the Parliament of Queensland on 10 August 2007, the Shire of Atherton merged with the Shires of Eacham, Herberton and Mareeba to form the Tablelands Region.

Towns and localities

The Shire of Atherton included the following settlements:

 Atherton
 Barrine
 Carrington
 Kairi
 Lake Tinaroo
 Tinaroo
 Tolga
 Upper Barron1
 Walkamin
 Wongabel

1 - split with the former Shire of Eacham

Population

Chairmen and mayors
 1884: Mr Selig 
 1906: T. Swan 
 1908: Thomas Rose 
 1927: Fred Gran 
 1988-2008: Jim Chapman

Other notable council members include:
 1916—1917: Harold Henry Collins, Member of the Queensland Legislative Assembly for the electorates of Cook and Tablelands

References

Further reading

External links
 

Former local government areas of Queensland
Far North Queensland
2008 disestablishments in Australia
Populated places disestablished in 2008